Colonel Croghan may refer to:

 George Croghan (1782), an American fur trader
 William Croghan Jr., the father of Mary Schenley
 George Croghan (17911849), a soldier in the US Army